Colonel Hoshiar Singh Dahiya, PVC (5 May 1930 – 6 December 1998) was an officer of the Indian Army who was awarded India's highest military honour, the Param Vir Chakra during Indo-Pakistani war of 1971.

Early life
Hoshiar Singh Dahiya  was born in Sisana village, Sonipat district, Haryana to Choudhary Hira Singh in a Jat family. After his schooling and one year's study at the Jat College, Rohtak, he joined the Army. He was married to Dhano Devi, who is still alive as of December 2021. He was commissioned in The Grenadiers Regiment of the Indian Army on 30 June 1963, and was promoted lieutenant on 30 June 1965.

His first posting was in NEFA. In the 1965 Indo-Pakistan war, he saw some action in the Rajasthan sector, for which he was mentioned in despatches. He was promoted to captain on 30 June 1969.

Param Vir Chakra Citation
The Param Vir Chakra citation on the Official Indian Army Website reads as follows:

Later career
Singh was promoted to substantive major on 30 June 1976, subsequently serving for two years as an instructor at the Officers Training School, Madras (now Chennai). In 1981 he was posted as an Instructor at the Indian Military Acdemy, Dehra Dun and was promoted to lieutenant-colonel on 8 April 1983, he eventually rose to command of his battalion. Having reached retirement age for his rank, Singh retired from the Army on 31 May 1988 with the honorary rank of colonel. He settled in Jaipur, but frequently visited his village of Sisana and successfully encouraged many local residents to join the armed forces. He succumbed to a cardiac arrest on 6 December 1998, aged 61, and was cremated with full military honours at Jaipur. He was survived by three sons, two of whom followed their father into the army as commissioned officers in the Grenadiers, with one joining the 3rd Grenadiers.

In popular culture 

Mohanlal reprised Major Hoshiar Singh's character as Major Sahadevan in the 2017 Malayalam film, 1971: Beyond Borders.

See also
Battle of Basantar

References

External links

1937 births
1998 deaths
Indian Army officers
Recipients of the Param Vir Chakra
People from Sonipat district
People of the Indo-Pakistani War of 1971
People from Rohtak